Scarus prasiognathos, the Singapore parrotfish, is a species of marine ray-finned fish, a parrotfish, in the family Scaridae. It is native to the eastern Indian and western Pacific Oceans, where it lives in coral reefs.

This species was first formally described in 1840 by the French naturalist Achille Valenciennes (1794-1865) with the type locality given as New Ireland in the Bismarck Archipelago.

References

prasiognathos
Fish of Thailand
Taxa named by Achille Valenciennes
Fish described in 1840
Fish of the Pacific Ocean